Helen Agaaqtuq Konek is a Inuk elder from Arviat, Nunavut. A 1949 photograph of her went viral in 2019.

Early life 
Konek was born as Helen Agaaqtuq in May 1932 in a tupiq on the eastern shore of Henik Lake. Helen's father was Piqqanaaq Agaaqtuq and her mother was Paalak Agaaqtuq. She had three brothers: Nanauq, Pukiluk, and Kinaalik. As a child she accompanied her brothers and father on caribou hunting trips, including to Ennadai Lake in the Ahiarmiut's territory.

Helen was photographed in 1949, aged 17, by Richard Harrington as part of a series taken while he was travelling around the Arctic. The photograph was taken in ᑭᖓᕐᔪᐊᓕᒃ (English: of big hill).

Adult life 
By 1952, the Agaaqtuq family were living close to the Padlei trading post. In 1953, Helen started living as a couple with James Konek, the son of a storekeeper in Arviat. They both lived in Arviat in winter and in Barren Lands area in the summer. The Canadian caribou famine caused Helen's mother Paalak to die in 1957, the rest of the family survived on fish, rabbit, and ptarmigan. The Royal Canadian Mounted Police forcibly displaced the Konek family in 1960 from Padlei to Arviat.

One of Harrington's photographs of Konek entering her igloo was widely shared online in 2019 after her journalist grandson Jordan Konek tweeted it. Konek is an elder, and lives in Arviat, Nunavut.

References 

1932 births
People from Arviat
Inuit from Nunavut
Canadian Inuit women
Living people